Eilema trispilota is a moth of the subfamily Arctiinae first described by Max Saalmüller in 1880. It is found on Madagascar.

References

trispilota
Moths described in 1880